Aldo Lombardi, better known as Kemic-Al, is a Maltese psychedelic trance producer who mainly releases his music on Butterfly Records.

Lombardi started to learn music at the age of 10, and when he was 16 he formed a ska-punk band named Gone Bonkers, which later changed its name to Dark Doings.

Kemic-Al learned his music at young age by learning to play guitar Spanish flamenco, his love for the music varies from classical music, up to the dance music of today, in fact classical orchestral sounds often heard in his compositions. He is also working on several projects Dimension-Al is one of them, music for chillout music, movie soundtracks, advertising etc.

Kemic-Al is in fact the first leading psychedelic producer from Malta, he has been djing and producing for several years now. Kemic-Al has taken up his original sound up the Dark path of psy trance which is earning him a reputable reputation. These shows from his depute album Twisted Parameters followed by his recent album The Dark Journal not to mention several singles released on varies labels. He is currently touring many countries with The Dark Journal including recent Boom Festival 2006.

Discography 

 Kemic-Al — Twisted Parameters 2005 Reviewed on Discogs.com
 Kemic-Al — The Dark Journal 2006 Reviewed on Discogs.com
 Kemic-Al — Singles Reviewed on Discogs.com

External links 
 Official website
 Official Myspace

Psychedelic trance musicians
Living people
Year of birth missing (living people)